George Henry Sullivan (March 15, 1897 – July 5, 1989) was an American football back who played two seasons with the Frankford Yellow Jackets of the National Football League. He played college football at the University of Pennsylvania. He was also a member of the Philadelphia Quakers and Atlantic City Roses.

Professional career

Frankford Yellow Jackets
Sullivan played in 22 games, starting twelve, for the Frankford Yellow Jackets from 1924 to 1925.

Philadelphia Quakers
Sullivan played in eight games, starting six, for the Philadelphia Quakers of the American Football League during the 1926 season. The AFL folded after the 1926 season.

Atlantic City Roses
Sullivan signed with the Atlantic City Roses of the Eastern League of Professional Football in 1927.

References

External links
Just Sports Stats

1897 births
1989 deaths
Players of American football from New York (state)
American football running backs
American football defensive backs
Penn Quakers football players
Frankford Yellow Jackets players
Philadelphia Quakers (AFL) players
Melrose Athletic Club players
People from Baldwinsville, New York